Erica Niamh Sanders  (born 18 May 1997) is an English field hockey player who plays as a forward for Dutch club hdm and the  England and Great Britain national teams.

Club careers
She plays club hockey in the Dutch Hoofdklasse for hdm.  

Sanders has also played for Surbiton, University of Birmingham and Beeston.

References

External links
Profile on England Hockey

1997 births
Living people
English female field hockey players
Beeston Hockey Club players
Surbiton Hockey Club players
Women's England Hockey League players
University of Birmingham Hockey Club players
Haagsche Delftsche Mixed players